Cheragh (also Romanized as Cherāgh; also known as ‘Alīābād-e Cherāgh) is a village in Khaveh-ye Jonubi Rural District, in the Central District of Delfan County, Lorestan Province, Iran. At the 2006 census, its population was 734, in 181 families.

References 

Towns and villages in Delfan County